Lowari Pass, or Lowari Top, (el. 10,230 ft.) is a high mountain pass that connects Chitral with Dir in Khyber-Pakhtunkhwa, Pakistan. Lowari Top is a relatively low pass, by far the lowest pass to enter Chitral, the rest all being 12,000 to 15,000 feet.

Lowari Top is closed by snow from late November to late May every year. During this time, jeeps cannot cross so men must travel by foot. This is dangerous, as there are high mountains on each side of Lowari Top, and a deadly avalanche can come at any moment without warning.

Every winter a few people are killed by avalanches while crossing Lowari Top. Their bodies are buried under the snow and it is only when the summer comes and the snow melts that their bodies are found and their fate learned.

Nevertheless, Lowari Top remains popular because it is the shortest route from Chitral to Peshawar. The other way would be down the Kunar River to Jalalabad through hostile Afghan Territory or the much longer route across Shandur Top to Gilgit.

Lowari Top crosses the Hindu Raj Mountains, a spur of the higher Hindu Kush. On the Chitral side of Lowari Top are the people of Ashret, who speak the Palula language and were assigned by the Mehtar of Chitral to be the guardians of Lowari Top.

On the Dir side reside Khowars, some of whom make their living as porters carrying loads across Lowari Top.

In 1954, the Mehtar of Chitral was killed when his airplane crashed into Lowari Top. 

The word "Top" is believed not to be the English word "top" but a word from an ancient language no longer spoken there.

The Lowari Top is one of the four major mountain passes to enter Chitral. The others are the Dorah Pass from Badakshan in Afghanistan, Shandur Top from Gilgit, and Broghol from the Wakhan Corridor in Afghanistan.

The Lowari Tunnel was constructed beneath Lowari Pass by Sambu, a South Korean company in 2009. However, the tunnel was abandoned shortly thereafter and has since fallen into disrepair.

The tunnel is functional as of December, 2019 and comprises over 8.5 Kilometres in length.

Books 
 The Gilgit Game by John Keay (1985) 
 The Kafirs of the Hindukush (1896) Sir George Scott Robertson.

External links
 President  Musharraf said in July 2005 work on the Lowari Tunnel would start in October 2005
 Lowari Pass one of 10 most dangerous roads in Pakistan

References

Chitral District
Upper Dir District
Mountain passes of Khyber Pakhtunkhwa
Hindu Raj